Cecil William Alderson  was a British-born Anglican Bishop of  (successively) Damaraland, Bloemfontein, and Mashonaland.

Early life 

He was born on 11 March 1900, educated at Merchant Taylors' and St John's College, Oxford, and ordained in 1926 after a period of study at Ely Theological College.

Clerical career 

He began his career with a curacy at  St Matthew, Westminster. From 1925 to 1930 he was Vice-Principal of his old theological college then a missionary in Likoma. In 1938 he became Warden of St Paul's College, Grahamstown, then in 1944 archdeacon of Port Elizabeth. He was bishop of Damaraland from 1949 to 1951 when he was translated to Bloemfontein. His last post was as bishop of Mashonaland where he played a key role in the foundation of the Bernard Mizeki College from around 1958 till the time of his death.

Honours 

He was admitted as a Sub-Prelate to the Order of St John of Jerusalem, he died on 12 February 1968.

Notes

References

External links 

 St Matthew's Westminster

1900 births
People educated at Merchant Taylors' School, Northwood
Alumni of St John's College, Oxford
Alumni of Ely Theological College
Archdeacons of Port Elizabeth
20th-century Anglican Church of Southern Africa bishops
Anglican bishops of Damaraland
Anglican bishops of Bloemfontein
Anglican bishops of Harare and Mashonaland
1968 deaths
Sub-Prelates of the Venerable Order of Saint John
Academic staff of St Paul's College, Grahamstown